Admiral Sir Charles Farrell Hillyar  (bapt. 19 December 1817 – 14 December 1888) was a Royal Navy admiral who went on to be Commander-in-Chief, China Station.

Naval career
The son of Admiral Sir James Hillyar, Charles Hillyar joined the Royal Navy in 1831. Promoted to Captain in 1852, he commanded HMS Gladiator in the Black Sea during the Crimean War. He commanded HMS Queen from 1859 and HMS Octavia from 1865.

Hillyar became Commander-in-Chief, East Indies and Cape of Good Hope in 1865, Commander-in-Chief, Pacific Station in 1872 and Commander-in-Chief, China Station in 1877. He retired in 1882.

Hillyar lived at Torre House at Torpoint in Cornwall.

See also

References

|-

|-

1817 births
1888 deaths
Royal Navy admirals
Knights Commander of the Order of the Bath